Byron is a town in Alfalfa County, Oklahoma, United States. The population was 35 at the time of the 2010 census.

History
Byron was named by Postmaster V. C. Spurrier, who received a postal designation on April 27, 1898 for a town to be named Byron - after his relative, Byron Spurrier, who owned a store there.  Originally located in Woods County, Byron became part of the newly organized Alfalfa County in 1907, at the time of statehood.

While the town was listed in an 1898 state gazetteer, its lack of railroad access caused the new settlement to develop slowly at first.  However, in April 1901, W. C. Edwards purchased land for a new townsite about a mile south and one-half mile east of the original settlement and within the course of a month the existing business buildings were moved from the old to the new town site and a new bank, meat market, and lumberyard had been opened.  In April 1902, the Woods County commission incorporated the town of Byron.  In anticipation of the arrival of the Kansas City, Mexico and Orient Railway line that ran south from Kansas through the county, a grain elevator was constructed in October.  Upon completion of the line to Byron on the 21st of October of that year, "the town celebrated with a huge bonfire, and the railroad laborers were treated to lemonade, cigars, and locally grown apples."

After the arrival of the railroad, Byron flourished economically.  The town's population reached it peak of 286 by 1909.  Notable businesses included the Byron State Bank, two newspapers - the Byron Republican and the Byron Promoter - and both a Christian and a Methodist church.  It also sported two hardware stores, three general stores, a blacksmith, and a flour mill.

Area farms produced both wheat and alfalfa and the town became an important market and shipping point for grain and livestock.  In 1929, one of the state's four warm-water fish hatcheries was established to produce sport fish for state lakes and farm ponds, which remains to this day.  However, Byron began a slow economic decline as falling agricultural prices and the Great Depression both took their toll.  By 1930, the census counted only 197 residents.

An interesting political development briefly brought Byron into the news, when in 1935 five women unseated five male incumbents on the town board. They proceeded to pay off the town's debt and began to produce income through the sale of electricity to its residents.

Nonetheless, in 1942, the railroad abandoned its line through town.  Through the 1940s and 1950s, only a half-dozen businesses were still in operation.  A declining rural population prompted the combining of Byron's school with those of nearby Driftwood.  Then in the 1960s, Burlington, Amorita, Byron, and Driftwood schools consolidated into a single school located in Burlington.  Its population continued to fall to 131 in 1950, 72 in 1970, and only 57 in 1990.  Byron ended the twentieth century with a population of 45, and by 2010, the U.S. Census counted just 35 residents.

Geography
Byron lies along State Highway 58.

Demographics

As of the census of 2000, there were 45 people, 19 households, and 14 families residing in the town. The racial makeup of the town was 100.00% White.

There were 19 households, out of which 26.3% had children under the age of 18 living with them, 73.7% were married couples living together, and 26.3% were non-families. 26.3% of all households were made up of individuals, and 15.8% had someone living alone who was 65 years of age or older. The average household size was 2.37 and the average family size was 2.86.

In the town, the population was spread out, with 20.0% under the age of 18, 6.7% from 18 to 24, 26.7% from 25 to 44, 24.4% from 45 to 64, and 22.2% who were 65 years of age or older. The median age was 40 years. For every 100 females, there were 73.1 males. For every 100 females age 18 and over, there were 80.0 males.

The median income for a household in the town was $34,000, and the median income for a family was $33,500. Males had a median income of $19,375 versus $16,875 for females. The per capita income for the town was $44,525. There were 12.5% of families and 11.1% of the population living below the poverty line, including no one under the age of 18 and none of those over 64.

Other links
 List of ghost towns in Oklahoma

References

External links
 Encyclopedia of Oklahoma History and Culture - Byron

Towns in Alfalfa County, Oklahoma
Towns in Oklahoma